Netiv HaGdud is a Neolithic archaeological site in the West Bank. It was discovered in the 1970s during the construction of an Israeli settlement and excavated by Ofer Bar-Yosef in the 1980s.

References 

1970s archaeological discoveries
Neolithic sites of Asia
Archaeological sites in the West Bank